Bacurius is a Latinized version of the Iranian-derived Georgian male given name.

It may refer to:

Bacurius I of Iberia, king of Iberia 234–249
Bacurius II of Iberia, king of Iberia 534–547
Bacurius III of Iberia, king of Iberia (died 580)
Bacurius the Iberian (died 394), Georgian commander in Roman army
Pacurius, 6th-century Georgian commander in Roman army

Georgian masculine given names